The HTC One Mini 2 is an Android smartphone designed and manufactured by HTC. The One Mini 2 is a mid-range variant of HTC's 2014 flagship high-end smartphone, the HTC One. As such, the One Mini 2 was designed to provide an overall experience as similar to its high-end counterpart as possible, while still being competitively priced in comparison to other smartphones in its range. Officially unveiled on 15 May 2014, the One Mini 2 was expected to be released mid-June in Europe, the Middle East and Asia, with no official date for other regions. On Verizon Wireless, the model is branded as the HTC One Remix.  The Remix differs from the One Mini 2 in that it has 1.5 GB of RAM.

Specifications 
The One mini 2 replaces the original HTC One Mini, which itself was a smaller, cut-down version of the HTC One M7 from 2013. The new “mini” smartphone has a 4.5 in high-definition screen, which makes it larger than an iPhone 5S and most other smaller, mid-range phones.
A new 5-megapixel camera on the front allow users to remove red eye and smooth out skin.

See also 
 HTC One series

References 

Android (operating system) devices
One
Discontinued smartphones